The Party of the Democratic Left (SDL) was a democratic-socialist political party in the Czech Republic from 1990 to 1997.

From 1992 to 1994, SDL was a member of a coalition called Left Bloc (Levý blok) that gained 14.05% in the 1992 Czech legislative election and 14.27% in the 1992 Czechoslovak parliamentary election. They did not form a part of the government.

On 21 June 1997, party dissolved and merged into Party of Democratic Socialism.

Name changes
 Democratic Left of the ČSFR (9 April 1990)
 Party of the Democratic Left (1993)

See also
 Party of the Democratic Left (Slovakia)
 Party of Democratic Socialism (Czech Republic)

References

Socialist parties in the Czech Republic
Political parties established in 1990
Political parties disestablished in 1997
Defunct political parties in the Czech Republic